Ştefan Gonata (February 1, 1838 in Trifăneşti – September 18, 1896 in Chişinău) was a Romanian politician and agronomist.  He was one of the founding members of the Romanian Academy.

1838 births
1896 deaths
People from Florești District
Politicians of the Russian Empire
Founding members of the Romanian Academy